Frederic Bartlett may refer to:

Frederic Bartlett (1886–1969), British psychologist 
Frederic Clay Bartlett (1873–1953), American artist, associated with the Second Presbyterian Church (Chicago, Illinois)
Frederick B. Bartlett (1882–1941), American bishop of Idaho

See also
Frederick Bartlett Fancher (1852–1944), American politician